The Ministry of Defence of the Republic of Latvia is the Latvian government ministry in charge of the formation and implementation of national security and defence policy, and for the overall management and control of related subordinate agencies. The ministry is headed by the politically appointed Minister of Defence.

The ministry was established on 22 November 1918 as the Ministry of Protection, just four days after the proclamation of the independence of Latvia. Jānis Zālītis, a member of the People's Council of Latvia, was appointed as minister. After the end of the Latvian War of Independence, in 1922 the ministry was renamed as the Ministry of War. 

After the occupation of Latvia in 1940 by the Soviet Union, the ministry was formally dissolved on 27 September 1940, and its building taken over by the HQ of the Baltic Military District of the Soviet Army until August 1994. On 13 November 1991, the ministry was re-established in its current form as the Ministry of Defence on the basis of the Public Security Department by the Supreme Council of the Republic of Latvia.

Core tasks
 Strategic analysis, research and development (R&D)
 The development of long-term policy including future strategic concepts and doctrines
 Perspective and structural planning
 Planning, budgeting and implementation in the medium and short term
 Overall management of agencies’ activities during the budget year
 Operational policy, planning and management at a strategic level
 Exercise policy, planning and management at a strategic level
 Emergency planning, policy and management at a strategic level
 Crisis management
 Development and implementation of security policy, both nationally  and internationally
 Development of defence cooperation with allied- and partner countries
 Strategic personnel management
 Information, communication and press relations
 Strategic leadership and management in the field of ICT
 Organisational development
 Preventive security at a strategic level
 Legal questions
 Controller / Internal audit
 Internal administration

See also
List of Ministers of Defence of Latvia

References

External links
Official website

Latvia
Government of Latvia
Military of Latvia